Elisabetha Grossmann (1795 - 1858), was a Swiss skipper. She ferried tourists over the Lake Brienz in the early 19th-century and became herself a famous tourist attraction for her beauty, known as La belle batelière de Brienz or Die schöne Schifferin von Brienz ('The Fair Skipper of Brienz').

References 
 Friedrich August Volmar: Elisabetha. Die schöne Schifferin vom Brienzersee. Das tragische Schicksal einer einst berühmten Schweizerin. Verlag Gute Schriften, Bern 1964.

1795 births
1858 deaths
19th-century Swiss people